Stickleyville is an unincorporated community and census-designated place (CDP) in Lee County, Virginia, United States. It has also been known as Stickleysville. The community was first listed as a CDP for the 2020 census.

The community is concentrated along U.S. Route 421 near the Lee County/Scott County line in the Wallen Creek Valley. Duffield lies across Powell Mountain to the east, and Pennington Gap lies across Wallen Ridge to the northwest.

A post office was established as Stickleysville in 1850. The community was named for Vastine Stickley, a pioneer settler.

References

Unincorporated communities in Lee County, Virginia
Unincorporated communities in Virginia
Census-designated places in Lee County, Virginia
Census-designated places in Virginia